Postal codes in the Czech Republic are called PSČ (PSČ, stands for ,  - postal routing number). The acronym is commonly  pronounced as a word, rather than separate letters. The system was introduced in former Czechoslovakia in 1973 and has remained unchanged. The postal code consists of five digits, usually written with a space in the form XXX XX. The first digit indicates a region (i.e. regions of Czechoslovakia as of the time when the PSČ system was put into use, hence some differences from the current administrative divisions):

1 - the capital of the Czech Republic, Prague (second digit represents one of 10 Prague districts, so e.g. 160 00 is the main post office in Prague 6 - Dejvice).
2 - central Bohemia (272 01 Kladno, 280 01 Kolín). Numbers 200 00 - 249 99 are reserved for internal needs of the postal system itself and are not assigned to any region. The Prague central distribution post office uses 225 00.
3 - western and southern Bohemia (301 00 - 326 00 Plzeň, 360 01 Karlovy Vary,  370 01 České Budějovice)
4 - northern Bohemia (400 01 Ústí nad Labem, 460 01 Liberec)
5 - eastern Bohemia and western Moravia (500 01 Hradec Králové, 530 01 Pardubice, 541 01 Trutnov, 586 01 Jihlava)
6 - southern Moravia (600 00 - 659 99 Brno, 690 01 Břeclav)
7 - eastern and northern Moravia (779 00 Olomouc, 760 01 Zlín, 700 01 - 729 99 Ostrava)
8,9,0 are assigned to Slovakia.

Addresses with large mail traffic can get their own postal code.

When writing the address, the postal code is put in front of the town name; when typed or printed, 1 space separates the leading 3 digits from the trailing 2 digits, and 2 spaces separate the postal code from the town name, e.g.:

Na Příkopě 28
115 03  Praha 1

On postal items being sent from abroad it is recommended to prepend the postal code with the ISO 3166-1 two-letter code of the country and a dash:

Na Příkopě 28
CZ-115 03  Praha 1
the Czech Republic

On envelopes and postcards there are usually five rectangular boxes below the address field for the postal code digits.

See also 
 ISO 3166-2:CZ

External links 
Search Postcode

Czech Republic
Postal system of the Czech Republic